Burak Bedikyan is a jazz pianist and composer.

Life and career
Bedikyan is "a Turk of Armenian ancestry". Early in his life, he was interested in contemporary classical music. From 1996, he studied with pianist Aydin Esen.

He has released four albums on SteepleChase Records.  The first, Circle of Life, was a quartet recording with Chris Potter (sax), Peter Washington (bass) and Bill Stewart (drums) that featured some of his own compositions as well as covers.

Discography
An asterisk (*) indicates that the year is that of release.

As leader/co-leader

As sideman

References

Living people
SteepleChase Records artists
Turkish jazz pianists
Year of birth missing (living people)
21st-century pianists